N'Ko is a standardized unified koiné form of several Manding languages written in the N'Ko alphabet. It is used in Guinea, Mali, Ivory Coast, Burkina Faso and some other West African countries, primarily, but not exclusively in written form, whereas in actual speech the different Manding varieties are used: Maninka, Bambara, Dyula and others.

Valentin Vydrin in 1999 and Coleman Donaldson in 2019 indicated that the popularity of writing Manding languages in the standardized N'Ko form is growing. This standardized written form is increasingly used for literacy education among the speakers of different varieties. It is also commonly used in electronic communication.

The standard strives to represent all Manding languages in a way that attempts to show a common "proto-Manding" phonology and the words' etymology, including when the actual pronunciation in modern spoken varieties is significantly different. In written communication each person will write it in a single unified way using the N'Ko script, and yet read and pronounce it as in their own linguistic variety.

Notes

References

External links 

 N'Ko–English–French–Arabic dictionary at kanjamadi.org

Manding languages
Standard languages
Languages attested from the 20th century